Shri S.P.M. Syed Khan is an Indian politician from the All India Anna Dravida Munnetra Kazhagam party who represented Tamil Nadu in the Rajya Sabha, the upper house of the Parliament of India.

External links
 Profile on Rajya Sabha website

Year of birth missing (living people)
Living people
All India Anna Dravida Munnetra Kazhagam politicians
Indian Muslims
Rajya Sabha members from Tamil Nadu
Place of birth missing (living people)